Sukur Ali Ahmed is an Indian politician. In 1996, 2001, 2011 and 2016 he was elected as Chenga Assembly constituency in Assam Legislative Assembly.

References

Living people
Year of birth missing (living people)
Place of birth missing (living people)
Assam MLAs 1996–2001
Assam MLAs 2001–2006
Assam MLAs 2011–2016
Assam MLAs 2016–2021